Podocarpus grayae is a species of conifer in the family Podocarpaceae, which is endemic to Australia. It is found only in the Northern Territory and Queensland.

Taxonomy and naming
Podocarpus grayae was first described in 1985 by David John de Laubenfels, who gave it the specific epithet, grayii, to honour Netta Elizabeth Gray (1913 - 1970). However, because Netta was a woman, the name was changed to grayae to accord with ICN Art. 60.8  of the Shenzhen Code, 2018.

References

External links
Podocarpus grayae occurrence data from Australasian Virtual Herbarium

grayae
Pinales of Australia
Least concern flora of Australia
Flora of the Northern Territory
Flora of Queensland
Least concern biota of Queensland
Taxonomy articles created by Polbot
Plants described in 1985
Taxa named by David John de Laubenfels